John Stephen Spagnola (born August 1, 1957) is a former American football tight end in the National Football League for the Philadelphia Eagles, Seattle Seahawks, and the Green Bay Packers.

Early life and education
Spagnola was born in Bethlehem, Pennsylvania. As a Boy Scout at Notre Dame Elementary School, he was awarded the Eagle Scout rank and was inducted into the Eagle Scout Hall of Fame.

High school career
He attended Bethlehem Catholic High School in Bethlehem, Pennsylvania, where he played wide receiver and linebacker. Bethlehem Catholic went 11-0-0 in 1974 with Spagnola as one of the team captains. He was a grade school and high school classmate of running back Mike Guman (Bethlehem Catholic, 1976), who later starred at Penn State and played 10 seasons in the National Football League with the Los Angeles Rams.

Collegiate career
After his 1975 graduation from Bethlehem Catholic, he attended Yale University, where he played wide receiver. He graduated in 1979 as the university's all-time leading wide receiver in receptions (88) and yards (1554). He was an honorable mention All-American tight end at Yale in 1979.

Career

NFL career
Spagnola was drafted in the ninth round of the 1979 NFL Draft by the New England Patriots. He played in eleven NFL seasons from 1979 to 1987 for the Philadelphia Eagles, the 1988 for the Seattle Seahawks, and the 1989 for the Green Bay Packers.

Spagnola was voted the Eagles' MVP (offensive) in 1984. His best year in the NFL came during the 1985 season for the Philadelphia Eagles when he caught 65 receptions for 701 yards and five touchdowns. In 1985, Spagnola and Mike Quick combined to set two club records; most receptions by two players (135) and most combined receiving yards (2,019), breaking a record previously shared by Hall of Famer Tommy McDonald and Timmy Brown.

He was a pro-bowl alternative in 1985 and 1984. He caught more passes (129) than any other tight end in the National Football Conference in 1985 and 1984.

He appeared in Super Bowl XV for the Philadelphia Eagles versus the Oakland Raiders, catching one reception for 22 yards.

Spagnola ranks 14th on the Eagles' all-time reception list with 256 catches for 2,833 yards. His 12 catches in one game against the New Orleans Saints in 1985 were just two short of the club record shared by Brian Westbrook and Don Looney.

Spagnola served as a player representative of the National Football League Players Association. During the labor strike in 1987, Spagnola's Philadelphia Eagles were the only NFL team whose players did not cross the strike line.

Spagnola was the first executive vice president of the National Football League Players Association.

In 2008-2009, Spagnola was sought by the National Football League Players Association's executive search firm Reilly Partners in Chicago to succeed Gene Upshaw as executive director. Spagnola remained in the running after the union pared its list of finalists to five.

Broadcasting career
Spagnola began broadcasting for ABC Sports television in 1991. He covered college football for the network as a color analyst, sideline reporter, and studio analyst through the 1998 season.

Business career
In 1984, Spagnola began his career in the financial services industry, working for First Boston Corporation in New York City and Philadelphia. During this time, Spagnola worked in institutional sales and trading where he developed an in depth knowledge of capital markets, proprietary trading. and corporate underwriting.

In 1992, with Michael Cosack, he co-founded Spagnola-Cosack, Inc., an independent investment consulting firm that serviced public, Taft-Hartley, corporate, hospital, endowment, and foundation Funds. Over a ten-year period, assets under advisement grew to over $3.5 billion. In 2003, Spagnola-Cosack, Inc. was acquired by Public Financial Management Group, a Philadelphia financial advisory firm. He brings over 23 years of investment experience to PFM Advisors.

As managing director of PFM Advisors, Spagnola serves on the investment committee, oversees marketing and client service and consulting with public, hospital, endowment, and Taft-Hartley Fund clients of the firm.

Academia career
Spagnola has taught a course on managing public funds for the Fels Institute of Government at the University of Pennsylvania.

References

Personal
Spagnola currently serves on the board of directors of Magee Rehabilitation Hospital, the Buckley Institute at Yale University, and the Greater Philadelphia Chamber of Commerce. He also serves on the advisory committee of St. Rose of Lima Parish in West Philadelphia and on the investment committee of Jefferson Health System in Philadelphia. He has three daughters, Nicole, Megan and Kelly.

External links
John Spagnola records at Ivy League Sports

1957 births
Living people
American football tight ends
Bethlehem Catholic High School alumni
College football announcers
Ed Block Courage Award recipients
Green Bay Packers players
People from Bryn Mawr, Pennsylvania
Philadelphia Eagles players
Players of American football from Pennsylvania
Seattle Seahawks players
Sportspeople from Bethlehem, Pennsylvania
University of Pennsylvania staff
Yale Bulldogs football players
Yale University alumni